Thantri or Tantri is the Vedic head who stand's in a top room in religion of Hindu. Thantri is person who set rule in temples, they are the authority in the temples of  Kerala and  temples in coastal Karnataka in southern India. It is a position held hereditarily . It is the thantri who installs the murti of the deity called prana pratishtha, and from that moment he assumes the position of the guru of the deity. The thantri is the authority on the rites and rituals of the temple.

Thantris are Shrauta Namboothiri Brahmins who study tantras, and belong to Poorva Mimamsa one of the 6 schools of thought in Hindu philosophy. Poorva mimamsa deals with the early parts of the Vedas. Another famous school of philosophy is Vedanta also known as Uttara Mimamsa, which means essence of Vedas. One common misconception about Vedanta is that writers think that it mostly deals with the later parts of the Vedas. It is the essence which enlightens one in the end is referred as Vedanta and not the physical ending parts.

Thantris  have the sole right to conduct certain core rituals in temples of Kerala and Tulunadu. In temples like Sabarimala, the presence of thantri is needed every day.

The daily rituals in Kerala temples are traditionally performed by Namboothiris, and often by Embranthiri migrants from the neighbouring Karnataka. Even among Namboothiris, only certain designated families  become thanthris. Thanthris have to perform the task of transferring (skt. Aavaahanam) the aura (skt. Chaithanyam) of deity and energizing the idol. The techniques employed are described in the aagamas .

The first step of a "Yajamaanan" (a person who has prepared himself mentally and financially) to build a temple, is to seek and accept ("Varikkal") an Aacharyan (Thanthri). Sanskrit text "Thanthra Samuchayam" identifies an ideal aachaaryan as one who is born  into a Brahmin family, has performed all the Shodasakriyas from Garbhaadhaanam to Agnyaadhaanam, has understood the concepts contained in the Vedas and Aagamas (Braahmacharyam, Gaarhasthhyam, Vaanaprasthham and Samnyaasam), has received blessings and Manthram advice from Gurus and elders, is an expert in performing rites and rituals (Karmams), is capable of receiving spiritual powers through meditation and penance ("Thapas"). Future Aachaaryans of the temple must be descendants of this Guru or Thanthri.

During the evolution and development of Thanthric philosophy, two kinds of aachaaryas emerged - the theoreticians and the practitioners. While the former developed concepts and prescribed procedures, the latter perfected their performance through strict discipline, leading to the attainment of the expected results.

Scriptures on Thanthras 

The treatises may be divided into three categories - Aagamas (Shaivism), Samhithas (Vaishnavism) and Thanthrams (Shakthism). Aagamas include Nigama versions too. The former are Shiva's advice to Parvathy, while Nigamas are spoken by Parvathy to Siva. Other classifications are regional, like Vishnukraanthaa, Rathhakraanthaa and Aswaakraanthaa, and also like Yaamalams and Daamarams.

There are treatises written by Keraleeyans as well. The most popular among them is the Thanthra Samuchayam by Chennas Narayanan Namboodiripad, who was one among the 18 ½ poets of the Saamoothiri's court. He consolidated and systematized the scattered literature which had then made its learning and practice quite cumbersome. Written in simple style and understandable by the common man, it covers topics like building of temples, consecration of murtis, kalasams, uthsavams and praayaschithams.

There have been several commentaries (skt. vyakhyanam) on it, both in Sanskrit and Malayalam. The treatise describes rituals related to seven deities, Siva, Vishnu, Durga, Saasthaavu, Subrahmanian, Ganapathy and Sankaranarayanan The aagamams of these deities have been condensed, as expressed by the author himself, when he stated "Swaagama-saara-samgrahaal".

Two known commentaries in Sanskrit are Vimarsini and Vivaranam. Later, there have been several translations into Malayalam, of which Kuzhikkaattu Pacha by Kuzhikkaattu Maheswaran Bhattathiripad is the most popular. Works such as Thozhaanooranushtthaanam and Parameswaraanushtthaanam deal with the same topics, also from Kerala.

References

External links
Namboothiri.com

Hindu priests